Lyle Dwight Carter (born April 29, 1945) is a former professional hockey goalie, who played 15 games in the National Hockey League with the California Golden Seals during the 1971–72 season. The rest of his career, which lasted from 1967 to 1975, was spent in various minor leagues. He was also an all-Canadian softball player.

Playing career
Born in Truro, Nova Scotia and raised in Brookfield, Carter began playing professional hockey in 1967–68, appearing in one game for the Toledo Blades in the IHL and two more with the Cleveland Barons. The following season, he played 72 regular games and a further 15 playoff games for the Clinton Comets of the Eastern Hockey League.  The following he spent split between the Comets and the Montreal Voyageurs of the AHL, appearing in 5 games for each team.

A member of the IHL's Muskegon Mohawks in 1970–1, Carter won the James Gatschene Memorial Trophy as the league's most valuable and most sportsmanlike as well as the James Norris Memorial Trophy as the goaltender with the best goals against average, as he posted a 2.43 GA and 6 shutouts in 51 games. He also appeared in one game for the Voyageurs, allowing 5 goals in two periods.

Carter played for four teams in 1971–2, seeing his first and only NHL action. He played in 15 games that season for the California Golden Seals, allowing 50 goals in 721 minutes played for a 4.16 GAA. He won 4 of 11 games, not bad for a team that won just 21 of 78 games for the season. He also played 9 games for the WHL's Salt Lake Golden Eagles, 6 for the AHL's Baltimore Clippers, and 5 play-off games for the CHL's Oklahoma City Blazers.

Carter played exclusively for Salt Lake in 1972–3, posting 16–13–6 for a win-lose-tie record in 35 games and recording a 3.58 GA, 0.894 save percentage, and one shutout.  The season he posted very solid numbers for the New Haven Nighthawks of the AHL, a 2.97 GA, 0.911 SV% and one shutout in 37 games. He also appeared in 10 playoff games for the Nighthawks. Carter's final year in pro hockey was 1974–5, when he appeared in 4 games for the Greensboro Generals of the SHL and 32 games with the AHL's Syracuse Eagles, where his numbers were not as good, a 5.11 GA in 32 games.

Carter was also an all-Canadian third baseman on four occasions as his club, the Brookfield Elks, advanced to the Canadian Softball Championships. He was a ten time Mainland Fastball League batting champion in Nova Scotia. He was elected to the Nova Scotia Sport Hall of Fame in 1984.

Career statistics

Regular season and playoffs

References

Nova Scotia Sport Hall of Fame inductee page

1945 births
Nova Scotia Sport Hall of Fame inductees
Baltimore Clippers players
California Golden Seals players
Canadian expatriate ice hockey players in the United States
Canadian ice hockey goaltenders
Canadian softball players
Cleveland Barons (1937–1973) players
Clinton Comets players
Greensboro Generals (SHL) players
Ice hockey people from Nova Scotia
Living people
Montreal Voyageurs players
Muskegon Mohawks players
New Haven Nighthawks players
Oklahoma City Blazers (1965–1977) players
People from Colchester County
People from Truro, Nova Scotia
Salt Lake Golden Eagles (WHL) players
Syracuse Eagles players
Toledo Blades players